Grady is a surname of Irish origin. It is derived from the Gaelic Ó Grádaigh meaning ‘descendant of Gráda’ (‘noble’). The O’Gradys of Kilballyowen were a prominent Munster clan and sept of the Dal gCaís.

Notable people with the surname "Grady" include

Adrian Grady (born 1985), American football player
Anthony Grady (born 1990), American football player
Arthur Grady (1922–1995), British water polo player
Benjamin F. Grady (1831–1914), American politician
Christine Grady, American nurse
Christopher W. Grady (born 1962), American admiral
Claire Grady, American civil servant
Clare Grady, American activist
Dennis Grady (1886–1974), American athletics coach
Don Grady (1944–2012), American composer
Donald Grady (born 1951), Canadian ski jumper
Ed Grady (1923–2012), American actor
Henry Grady (disambiguation), multiple people
J. Harold Grady (1917–2002), American politician
James Grady (born 1971), Scottish footballer
James Grady (author) (born 1949), American writer
Jo Grady (born 1984), British trade unionist
Joe Grady (1918–2020), American radio personality
John Grady (disambiguation), multiple people
Kellan Grady (born 1997), American basketball player
Kevin Grady (born 1986), American football player
Kraig Grady (born 1962), Australian-American sound artist
Lottie Grady (1887–1970), American comedian
Lucretia del Valle Grady (1982–1972), American activist
Mason Grady (born 2002), Welsh rugby union footballer
Michael Grady (born 1996), American rower
Mike Grady (disambiguation), multiple people
Monica Grady (born 1958), British scientist
Patricia A. Grady, American neuroscientist
Patrick Grady (born 1980), Scottish politician
Paul Grady, American police officer
Rachel Grady, American filmmaker
Richard Grady (born 1955), Canadian ski jumper
Robert Grady (disambiguation), multiple people
Sandy Grady (1928–2015), American sportswriter
Shane Grady (born 1989), English rugby union footballer
Tammy Hansen Grady, American recording artist
Thomas Grady (disambiguation), multiple people
Tommy Grady (born 1985), American football player
Warren A. Grady (1924–2019). American judge and politician
Wayne Grady (born 1957), Australian golfer
Wayne Grady (author) (born 1948), Canadian writer and editor
W. Mack Grady, American engineer
W. Robert Grady (born 1950), American politician

Fictional characters
Owen Grady, a character in the film series Jurassic Park

See also
Grady (given name), a page for people with the given name "Grady"
Grady (disambiguation), a disambiguation page for "Grady"
Senator Grady (disambiguation), a disambiguation page for Senators surnamed "Grady"

Notes

Anglicised Irish-language surnames
Surnames of Irish origin